Saga Airlines was a charter airline based in Istanbul, Turkey, which served the tourism industry.

History 
The airline was established in 2004 and started operations in June 2004. It was owned by Abdulkadir Kolot.
Saga Airlines ceased its operations in 2013.

Operations 
Saga Airlines operated an extensive programme of charter flights between Turkey and Northern European countries on behalf of various tour operators. They also supplied aircraft for lease to other airlines.

Fleet

As of May 2013, Saga Airlines operated no aircraft as its last active Airbus A320 has been returned to its lessor.

Retired fleet
Airbus A300B2, went to Mahan Airlines in 2006.
Airbus A310-300, went to Iran Air Tours in 2012. 
Airbus A320-200, returned to lessor in 2013.
Airbus A330-300, went to Air Transat in 2011.
Boeing 737-400, left fleet in 2010.
Boeing 737-800, left fleet in 2012.

References

External links
Official site

Defunct airlines of Turkey
Airlines established in 2004
Airlines disestablished in 2013
2013 disestablishments in Turkey
Turkish brands
Defunct charter airlines of Turkey
Turkish companies established in 2004